The South Atlantic conflict was a series of crises, undeclared wars, and other conflicts between Argentina, the United Kingdom, and later Chile (on the British side) in the Southern Atlantic Ocean. It was incited by the Argentine navy's prevention of the UK's reoccupation of its territories on the Antarctic Peninsula, and included the Falklands War and Invasion of South Georgia. The conflict, despite a large number of stalemates, ultimately ended in British victory.

Background
In 1908 and 1917, the United Kingdom laid claim to a portion of Antarctica, as well as a collection of offshore islands. These claims worried Argentina, an enemy of the UK, who responded with claims of their own. These  conflicting claims came to a head in 1948 and 1952, in the Battle of Deception Island and the Hope Bay incident, respectively.

Battle of Deception Island
In 1948, both British and Argentine naval forces landed on Deception Island off Antarctica. This volcanic caldera, forming a natural harbor that was ice - free year round owing to its volcanically heated waters, is strategically located in the Drake Passage and was a prime target for both countries. Gunfire was sporadically exchanged but no casualties occurred, and the conflict ended in a stalemate.

Hope Bay Incident

Conflict again occurred in 1952 when British soldiers aboard the warship John Biscoe landed on the peninsula to reoccupy a defunct base near a newly - established Argentinian encampment. This was viewed as a hostile invasion by the Esperanza Detachment, the unit in charge of securing the Argentinian base, who responded with warning shots. The John Biscoe retreated to the British colony on the Falkland islands for further instructions. It returned along with the significantly more powerful HMS Burghead Bay, an action that caused the Argentine forces to retreat and apologize.

Temporary Peace

International and UN Action
7 years later, in 1959, peace was reached due to the implementation of the Antarctic Treaty System. This treaty prohibited military action on the continent, established borders of countries' claims, and arbitrated territorial disputes. The treaty led to a 23 - year period of peace in the South Atlantic, during which time the continent was populated and extensive research was conducted.

On 14 December 1960, the United Nations passed Resolution 1514, granting independence to "colonies". This was interpreted by Argentina to mean that the UK must withdraw from the Falkland Islands, an archipelago just north of the Antarctic Treaty area. In response, the UN instructed Argentina and the UK to begin negotiations with regards to the Falklands, and to present arguments to the UN as to why Resolution 1514 supported their respective cases.  In 1964, the Argentinian representative Jose Ruda presented the Argentine case, but the UN decided to not take a stance.

Operation Condor Incident
In 1966, the 23 years' peace was briefly interrupted by Operation Condor, an attempt by Argentine terrorists to take control of the Falkland Islands. The terrorists hijacked Aerolíneas Argentinas Flight 648 and forced it to land on the Falklands. After taking several hostages to demand that the territory be surrendered, a Catholic priest convinced them to desist.

First Invasions
In 1976, the democratic government of Argentina, led by the left - wing Peronist faction, was overthrown by the military and replaced with a dictatorship. This unpopular new government decided to show its strength by asserting its dominance over the South Atlantic region with a series of invasions.

Invasion of the Falkland Islands

On 2 April 1982, 20 Argentine amphibious vehicles arrived at the port of Stanley. They offloaded 630 Argentine troops who proceeded to seize control of the archipelago. Very few casualties occurred, with the Argentine army sending some of its captives back to Britain and imprisoning some.

Invasion of South Georgia

A day later, on 3 April 1982, 60 Argentine troops landed at the port of Grytviken aboard a civilian scrap metal ship. They quickly overwhelmed the British defences, seizing the island of South Georgia, and by extension, the South Sandwich Islands. No British casualties occurred, while one Argentine helicopter was shot down, resulting in 4 deaths. The British soldiers on the island were sent back to Britain.

International Response
The United Nations Security Council ordered the Argentine forces to withdraw from the islands and instructed the belligerents to peacefully negotiate. The Argentine military ignored these orders and the UNSC did not enforce them with military action.

Occupation
Once the Argentines consolidated power on the islands, they implemented a new government that would last around two and a half months. The islands were renamed the "Malvinas", their capital "Puerto Argentino", and their currency was changed to the Argentine peso. The Argentines committed no significant human rights abuses towards the islanders. Those who opposed the new Argentine government were sent to Uruguay for transportation to Britain.

Reconquest
On 2 May 1982, a British submarine sank an Argentine cruiser, signaling the beginning of a battle. Rather than attempting to force their way through the Argentine navy blockade at Stanley, the British forces opted to land on the opposite, less protected west side of the island. From there they fought their way across the island, recapturing the city of Goose Green along with other small towns. Finally, in early June, the British land forces reached Stanley, while other British ships blockaded the Stanley harbor, effectively cutting it off from the rest of the world. On June 14, it became clear that the Argentines would soon be starved out, and their commander surrendered, on the condition that the Argentines could remain armed and would be sent back to Argentina. This surrender marked the end of the Falklands war.

Aftermath
The war, despite being a relatively minor conflict in terms of casualties and cost, had large political ramifications on both the UK and Argentina.

Argentina
The failure of the Argentine military junta to capture the Falklands was interpreted by the Argentine public as weakness. Mass protests were held, which led to the fall of the junta and a return to democratic rule.

United Kingdom
For the UK, the victory of their army was a large factor in boosting the popularity of prime minister Margaret Thatcher and her Conservative party. She was reelected in a landslide, and  her party gained a large majority in the House of Commons. In addition, to ensure the loyalty of the Falkland Islanders, the British parliament passed the British Nationality (Falkland Islands) Act of 1983, granting British citizenship to the islands' inhabitants.

References

Falklands War